Steur is a Dutch surname. Steur is the Dutch word for sturgeon and the surname may be metonymic for a fisherman or may have referred to an address named "de steur" (especially in the form "Van der Steur"). The surname Steurs, mostly limited to the Belgian provinces of Antwerp and Brabant, may have a different origin. People with the name include:

Steur
Jonas Steur (born 1982), Belgian Trance DJ and producer 
Sebastiaan Steur (born 1984), Dutch footballer
Jansen Steur
Ernst Jansen Steur (born 1945), Dutch neurologist
De Steur
Petra De Steur (born 1972), Belgian singer
van der Steur 
Ad van der Steur (1893–1953), Dutch architect
Ard van der Steur (born 1969), Dutch politician and lawyer
Steurs
 (born 1958), Belgian linguist
Geert Steurs (born 1981), Belgian road bicycle racer
Gerard Steurs (1901–1961), Belgian long-distance runner
Karen Steurs (born 1979), Belgian road bicycle racer

References

Dutch-language surnames